Lhasa West railway station is a railway station in Lhasa, Tibet Autonomous Region, People's Republic of China.

Schedules 
This station is a cargo station, no passenger trains stop at here as of July 2006.

See also 
 List of stations on Qingzang railway

External links 
 Google Maps
 Photos

Stations on the Qinghai–Tibet Railway
Railway stations in Tibet
Transport in Lhasa
Doilungdêqên District